The Two Widows is a two-act Czech opera by Bedřich Smetana based on the libretto of Emanuel Züngel. The libretto is based on Jean Pierre Felicien Mallefille's one-act play Les deux veuves. The opera was composed between June 1873 and January 1874, and its premiere took place on 27 March 1874 at the Prague Czech Theatre under the direction of Smetana. However, this premiere was not successful and the opera was rewritten in 1874. The spoken dialogue was replaced by through-composed recitatives and some of the music and characters were reworked. The second premiere on 20 October 1874 was very successful.  A further revised version was premiered on 17 March 1878, under Adolf Čech.

For a later performance in Hamburg in 1882 "Smetena reluctan[t]ly added a trio in act 1 and an alternative ending to Agnes' aria in act 2, and consented to a redivision of the opera into three acts".

Performance history
The US premiere took place in New York on 23 October 1949 and it was first given in the UK on 17 June 1963 at the Guildhall School of Music.

Kurt Honolka provided a German version in 1958.

The opera was presented by Scottish Opera in 2008 at the Edinburgh Festival.

Roles

Synopsis
Place: A castle in Bohemia (Czech Republic).

Act 1
At the castle, the people are celebrating. The two widows, Caroline and Agnes, who live there are very different. The landlady, Caroline, is happy about her liberty and independence, while Agnes cannot make friends since she is still in mourning. Caroline is pressed by her suitor, Ladislaus. However, she does not want to marry him. So Caroline conspires to have Agnes fall in love with Ladislaus. Caroline invites Ladislaus to the castle, where he is arrested by Mumlal. Ladislaus is condemned to one day house arrest in the castle. Ladislaus accepts the punishment. However, Agnes cannot be made interested in him. At the end of the act, Lidka and Toník with the choir sing about love.

Act 2
While in prison, Ladislaus sings a love song, which awakens in Agnes the feeling of love. However, Agnes cannot confess to her feelings. Even Caroline's scheme and Ladislaus's confession does not change her feelings. Only as Caroline begins to flirt with Ladislaus, that Agnes admits her feelings to Ladislaus. The envious Mumlal cannot divert Lidka and Toník from making love to each other. At the ball, both of them get married.

Recordings
1956, Jaroslav Krombholc (conductor), Prague National Theatre Orchestra and Chorus; Drahomíra Tikalová, Ivo Žídek, Maria Tauberová, Miloslava Fidlerová, Antonín Zlesák, Eduard Haken
1974, Jaroslav Krombholc (conductor), Symphony Orchestra and Chorus of the Prague Radio; Jana Jonášová, Marcela Machotková, Miroslav Švejda, Dalibor Jedlička, Alfred Hampel, Daniela Šounová-Brouková<ref>Zychowicz, James L.
[http://www.operatoday.com/content/2008/08/smetana_dve_vdo.php "SMETANA: Dvě vdovy (The Two Widows) review of the recording] 17 August 2008 on operatoday.com Retrieved 4 March 2012</ref>
1975, František Jílek (conductor), Prague National Theatre Chorus and Orchestra; Naďa Šormová, Marcela Machotková, Jiří Zahradníček, Jaroslav Horáček, Zdeněk Švehla, Daniela Šounová

References
Notes

Sources
Holden, Amanda (Ed.), The New Penguin Opera Guide'', New York: Penguin Putnam, 2001. 

Operas by Bedřich Smetana
Czech-language operas
1874 operas
Operas
Operas based on plays
Operas set in Europe